The Story of Menstruation is a 1946 10-minute American animated film produced by Walt Disney Productions. It was commissioned by the International Cello-Cotton Company (now Kimberly-Clark) and was shown in a non-theatrical release to approximately 105 million American students in health education classes.  In 2015, it was selected for preservation in the National Film Registry.

History
It was part of a 1945 to 1951 series of films that Disney produced for American schools. Gynecologist Mason Hohn was hired as a consultant to ensure that the film was scientifically accurate. Hohn was hired to increase the likelihood that school doctors and nurses would allow the film to be shown. Hohn's involvement led to a stronger emphasis on biology than other marketing by ICCC. The Story of Menstruation increased its reputation when it received the Good Housekeeping Seal of Approval.

It was one of the first commercially sponsored films to be distributed to high schools. It was distributed with a booklet for teachers and students called Very Personally Yours that featured advertising of the Kotex brand of products, and discouraged the use of tampons, where the market was dominated by the Tampax brand of tampons from Tampax Inc.

In 2015, the United States Library of Congress selected the film for preservation in the National Film Registry, finding it "culturally, historically, or aesthetically significant."

Plot

The film uses animated diagrams to detail the menstrual cycle. The film's narrator, who is not identified in the credits, informs the viewer that "there is nothing strange or mysterious about menstruation", and it shows women engaged in such activities as bathing, riding a horse, and dancing during their menstrual cycles. The film's narration by actress Gloria Blondell also provides advice to avoid constipation and depression, and to always keep up a fine outward appearance.

The Story of Menstruation is believed to be the first film to use the word "vagina" in its screenplay. Neither sexuality nor reproduction is mentioned in the film, and an emphasis on sanitation makes it, as Disney historian Jim Korkis has suggested, "a hygienic crisis rather than a maturational event".  The menstrual flow was depicted as snow white instead of blood red.

The film's copyright was renewed by Walt Disney Productions on December 3, 1973.

See also
 Culture and menstruation

References

External links
 
 
 The Story of Menstruation at D23's Disney A to Z

1946 animated films
1946 short films
1946 films
American animated short films
American social guidance and drug education films
1940s Disney animated short films
Menstrual cycle
Sponsored films
Disney educational films
United States National Film Registry films
1940s educational films
1951 films
1950s English-language films
1940s English-language films
1950s American films